The Freewheelers (also known as the San Francisco Historical Automobile Society) is the world's oldest gay classic car club, founded in 1978.  There are over 350 members, who have over 1700 vintage and classic cars.  The broad variety of cars in the club reflects the diverse tastes and interests of the membership.  While the primary membership base is in Northern California, there are members throughout the United States, in Canada, and overseas.  The club has one weekend rally, tour, or event every month, as well as monthly mid-week cruise nights from April through October.  Significant annual events are the Benefit Car Show in September, the West Coast Meet in July (where multiple clubs join together), and the Holiday Party.

Ownership of a classic or vintage car is not a requirement for membership, just an interest in vintage and classic automobiles.

External links
 

Automobile associations in the United States
Organizations established in 1978
LGBT organizations in the United States
1978 establishments in California